Cicindela carlana is a species of ground beetle of the subfamily Cicindelinae. It is found in Burma and Thailand.

References

carlana
Beetles described in 1893
Beetles of Asia